Jalan Londang (Malacca state route M157) is a major road in Malacca, Malaysia. It is also a main route to Tanjung Bidara beach.

List of junctions 

Roads in Malacca